Alienators: Evolution Continues is an action game for the Game Boy Advance. It was developed by Digital Eclipse and published by Activision. The game was released in November 2001. The game is based on the animated science fiction TV show Alienators: Evolution Continues. The player plays as Dr. Ira Kane to save the world from alien domination.

Reception 

The game received mostly mixed reviews. Critics enjoyed its graphics and music, but it was criticized for its password save system and generic gameplay.

References 

2001 video games
Action video games
Alien invasions in video games
Game Boy Advance games
Game Boy Advance-only games
Video games about extraterrestrial life
Video games based on animated television series
Video games developed in the United States
Digital Eclipse games
Single-player video games
Video games scored by Allister Brimble